David John Ellis (born 13 April 1934) is a former English cricketer.  Ellis was a right-handed batsman.  He was born in Middlesbrough, Yorkshire.

Ellis made his debut for Durham against Northumberland in the 1961 Minor Counties Championship.  He played Minor counties cricket for Durham from 1961 to 1966, making 36 Minor Counties Championship appearances.  He made his List A debut against Hertfordshire in the 1964 Gillette Cup.  In this match, he scored 2 runs before being dismissed by Robin Marques.  He made a further List A appearance against Sussex in the following round of the same competition.  He scored a single run in this match, before being dismissed by Ian Thomson, with Sussex winning by 200 runs.

References

External links
David Ellis at ESPNcricinfo

1934 births
Living people
Cricketers from Middlesbrough
English cricketers
Durham cricketers
English cricketers of 1946 to 1968